Chapman Lake or Lake Chapman may refer to:

Chapman Lake (Pennsylvania), a reservoir in Warren County
Chapman Lake (Wisconsin), a lake in Sauk County
Jim Chapman Lake, a lake in Hopkins County, Texas
Lake Chapman (Antarctica), a lake located at Granite Harbour
Chapman Lake (Gouin Reservoir), Quebec, Canada

See also
Chapman (disambiguation)